Banda Singh Bahadur (born Lachman Dev) (27 October 1670 – 9 June 1716), was a Sikh warrior and a commander of Khalsa army. At age 15, he left home to become an ascetic, and was given the name Madho Das Bairagi. He established a monastery at Nānded, on the bank of the river Godāvarī. In 1707, Guru Gobind Singh accepted an invitation to meet Bahadur Shah I in southern India, he visited Banda Singh Bahadur in 1708. Banda became disciple of Guru Gobind Singh and was given a new name, Gurbaksh Singh (as written in Mahan Kosh), after the baptism ceremony. He is popularly known as Banda Singh Bahadur. He was given five arrows by the Guru as a blessing for the battles ahead. He came to Khanda, Sonipat and assembled a fighting force and led the struggle against the Mughal Empire.

His first major action was the sacking of the Mughal provincial capital, Samana, in November 1709. After establishing his authority and Khalsa rule in Punjab, Banda Singh Bahadur abolished the zamindari system, and granted property rights to the tillers of the land. Banda Singh was captured by the Mughals and tortured to death in 1715–1716.

Early life
Banda Singh Bahadur was born in a Hindu family to farmer Ram Dev, at Rajouri (now in Jammu and Kashmir). Sources variously describe his father as a Rajput of Bhardwaj gotra or a Dogra Rajput. Hakim Rai's Ahwāl-i-Lachhmaṇ Dās urf Bandā Sāhib ("Ballad of Banda Bahadur") claims that his family belonged to the Sodhi sub-caste of the Khatris. However, this claim appears to have been an attempt to portray him as Guru Gobind's successor, since the preceding Sikh Gurus were Sodhis.

Military campaigns

Early conquests
After meeting with Guru Gobind Singh, he marched towards Khanda, Sonipat and fought the Mughals with the help of the Sikh army in Battle of Sonipat.

In 1709, he defeated Mughals in the Battle of Samana and captured the Mughal city of Samana (30 km southwest of Patiala). Samana minted coins. With this treasury, the Sikhs became financially stable. The Sikhs soon seized Mustafabad (now Saraswati Nagar) and Sadaura (both places in present Yamunanagar district, Northern eastern Haryana). The Sikhs then captured the Cis-Sutlej areas of Punjab, including Malerkotla and Nahan.

On 12 May 1710, in the Battle of Chappar Chiri, the Sikhs killed Wazir Khan, the Governor of Sirhind and Dewan Suchanand, who were responsible for the martyrdom of the two youngest sons of Guru Gobind Singh. Two days later, the Sikhs captured Sirhind. Banda Singh was now in control of territory from the Sutlej to the Yamuna. He ordered that the ownership of the land should be given to the farmers and to let them live in dignity and self-respect.

Military Invasions

Banda Singh Bahadur developed the village of Mukhlisgarh and made it his capital. He then renamed it to Lohgarh (fortress of steel) where he issued his own mint. The coin described Lohgarh: "Struck in the City of Peace, illustrating the beauty of civic life, and the ornament of the blessed throne".

He briefly established a state in Punjab for half a year. Banda Singh sent Sikhs to the Uttar Pradesh and Sikhs took over Saharanpur, Jalalabad, Muzaffarnagar and other nearby areas.

Revolutionary
Banda Singh Bahadur is known to have halted the Zamindari and Taluqdari system in the time he was active and gave the farmers proprietorship of their own land. It seems that all classes of government officers were addicted to extortion and corruption and the whole system of regulatory and order was subverted.

Local tradition recalls that the people from the neighborhood of Sadaura came to Banda Singh complaining of the iniquities practices by their landlords. Banda Singh ordered Baj Singh to open fire on them. The people were astonished at the strange reply to their representation and asked him what he meant. He told them that they deserved no better treatment when being thousands in number they still allowed themselves to be cowed down by a handful of Zamindars. He defeated the Sayyids and Shaikhs in the Battle of Sadhaura.

Persecution from the Mughals
The rule of the Sikhs over the entire Punjab east of Lahore obstructed the communication between Delhi and Lahore, the capital of Punjab, and this worried Mughal Emperor Bahadur Shah He gave up his plan to subdue rebels in Rajasthan and marched towards Punjab.

The entire Imperial force was organized to defeat and kill Banda Singh Bahadur. All the generals were directed to join the Emperor's army. To ensure that there were no Sikh agents in the army camps, an order was issued on 29 August 1710 to all Hindus to shave off their beards.

Banda Singh was in Uttar Pradesh when the Moghal army under the orders of Munim Khan marched to Sirhind and before the return of Banda Singh, they had already taken Sirhind and the areas around it. The Sikhs therefore moved to Lohgarh for their final battle. The Sikhs defeated the army but reinforcements were called and they laid siege on the fort with 60,000 troops. Gulab Singh dressed himself in the garments of Banda Singh and seated himself in his place.

Banda Singh left the fort at night and went to a secret place in the hills and Chamba forests. The failure of the army to kill or catch Banda Singh shocked Emperor, Bahadur Shah and on 10 December 1710 he ordered that wherever a Sikh was found, he should be murdered.

Banda Singh Bahadur wrote Hukamnamas to the Sikhs to reorganize and join him at once. In 1712, the Sikhs gathered near Kiratpur Sahib and defeated Raja Ajmer Chand, who was responsible for organizing all the Hill Rajas against Guru Gobind Singh and instigating battles with him. After Bhim Chand's dead the other Hill Rajas accepted their subordinate status and paid revenues to Banda Singh.
While Bahadur Shah's four sons were killing themselves for the throne of the Mughal Emperor, Banda Singh Bahadur recaptured Sadhaura and Lohgarh. Farrukh Siyar, the next Mughal Emperor, appointed Abdus Samad Khan as the governor of Lahore and Zakaria Khan, Abdus Samad Khan's son, the Faujdar of Jammu.

In 1713 the Sikhs left Lohgarh and Sadhaura and went to the remote hills of Jammu and where they built Dera Baba Banda Singh. During this time Sikhs were being persecuted especially by Mughals in the Gurdaspur region.
Banda Singh came out and captured Kalanaur and Batala(both places in modern Gurdaspur district which rebuked Farrukh Siyar to issue Mughal and Hindu officials and chiefs to proceed with their troops to Lahore to reinforce his army.

Siege in Gurdas Nangal

In March 1715, the army under the rule of Abd al-Samad Khan, the Mughal governor of Lahore, drove Banda Bahadur and the Sikh forces into the village of Gurdas Nangal,6 km to the west of city Gurdaspur, Punjab and laid siege to the village. The Sikhs defended the small fort for eight months under conditions of great hardship, but on 7 December 1715 the Mughals broke into the starving garrison and captured Banda Singh and his companions.

Excommunication and rivalry with Tat Khalsa 
In 1714, a resolute effort was envisaged by Farrukh Siyar to suppress Banda's rebellion, who was evading capture despite significant Mughal endeavors and investment of resources. At first, Mata Sundari (Guru Gobind's widow) was asked to persuade Banda to stop his lawlessness and expedition against the Mughals in exchange for jagirs and recruitment for Sikh soldiers into the imperial army. Banda declined on account of his lack of trust in the government. The Emperor had then imprisoned both of Gobind's widows, prompting Sundari to write to Banda again to get him to submit. Banda had again declined, leading the Emperor to tighten the restrictions on the widows, culminating in the excommunication of Banda Singh Bahadur by Mata Sundari for refusing to submit to the Emperor as per her demands. She further accused him of reigning over the Sikhs as their "Guru". This dispute led to two separate factions of the contemporary Sikh community, the Tat Khalsa; who was allied to Mata Sundari, and the Bandais; who were allied to Banda Singh Bahadur. Mata Sundari's intervention led to half of Banda's followers (approximately fifteen thousand) abandoning him prior to the siege of Gurdas Nangal. Disputes between the Tat Khalsa and the Bandais primarily included topics including Banda's abandonment of the traditional blue robes in favor of red ones, Banda's insistence on vegetarianism, and Banda's replacement of the prescribed Sikh slogan with "Fateh Darshan" as well as concerns over excesses committed by Banda's troops during their campaign of retribution against the Mughals. Banda's excommunication impeded his ability to counter the Mughals and contributed to his eventual capture and execution. 

Modern Sikh tradition speaks of at least two different Khalsas; the Tat Khalsa following the polity and dictates of Guru Gobind Singh precisely, and the Bandais; those who adopted and augmented the principles of Banda Singh Bahadur. The Bandais were reprimanded by Mata Sundari in a hukam-nama.

Execution
 Banda Singh Bahadur was put into an iron cage and the remaining Sikhs were chained. The Sikhs were brought to Delhi in a procession with the 780 Sikh prisoners, 2,000 Sikh heads hung on spears, and 700 cartloads of heads of slaughtered Sikhs used to terrorise the population. They were put in the Delhi fort and pressured to give up their faith and become Muslims.

The prisoners remained unmoved. On their firm refusal these non-converters were ordered to be executed. Every day 100 Sikh soldiers were brought out of the fort and murdered in public. This continued for approximately seven days. He was told to kill his four-year-old son, Ajai Singh, which he refused to do. So, Ajai Singh was murdered, his heart was cut out, and thrust into Banda Bahadur's mouth. However, his resolution did not break under torture, and so he was martyred. After three months of confinement, on 9 June 1716, Banda Singh's eyes were gouged out, his limbs were severed, his skin removed, and then he was killed.

Battles fought by Banda Singh 
 Battle of Sonipat
 Battle of Samana
 Battle of Sadhaura
 Battle of Chappar Chiri
 Battle of Sirhind
 Battle of Jalalabad (1710)
 Battle of Rahon
 Battle of Lohgarh
 Battle of Jammu (1712)
 Battle of Gurdas Nangal Or Siege of Gurdaspur

Baba Banda Singh Bahadur War Memorial

A war memorial was built where Battle of Chappar Chiri was fought, to glorify heroic Sikh soldiers. The 328 feet tall Fateh Burj was dedicated to Banda Singh Bahadur who led the army and defeated the Mughal forces. The Fateh Burj is taller than Qutab Minar and is an octagonal structure. There is a dome at the top of the tower with Khanda made of stainless steel.

In popular culture 
Sarbans Dani Guru Gobind Singh, a 1998 Indian Punjabi-language drama film directed by Ram Maheshwari. The film follows the Guru and Banda Singh Bahadur's struggle against the Mughal Empire.
Rise of Khalsa, a 2006 Indian animated historical drama film by Vismaad Mediatech.
Chaar Sahibzaade: Rise of Banda Singh Bahadur, a 2016 Indian computer-animated film by Harry Baweja. A sequel to Chaar Sahibzaade, it follows Banda Singh Bahadur's fight against the Mughals under the guidance of Guru Gobind Singh.
Guru Da Banda, a 2018 Indian animated historical drama film by Jassi Chana.

Gallery

See also

Sharan Kaur Pabla
Nanua Bairagi 
Hari Singh Nalwa
Sawan Mal
Rattan Singh Bhangu
Bhai Mani Singh
Baba Darbara Singh
Baba Binod Singh
Baj Singh
Sambhaji
Rahon

References

1716 deaths
1670 births
People from Nanded district
Dogra people
Sikh martyrs
Sikh warriors
History of Punjab
People executed for refusing to convert to Islam
Converts to Sikhism from Hinduism
Executed Indian people
People executed by the Mughal Empire
18th-century executions
Indian warriors